is a Japanese snowboarder. She has competed in the halfpipe event at the 2006 Winter Olympics, where she placed 10th, and the 2010 Winter Olympics, where she placed 16th. She also competed at the World Snowboard Championships from 2003 through 2009.

References

External links
 

1974 births
Living people
Japanese female snowboarders
Olympic snowboarders of Japan
Snowboarders at the 2006 Winter Olympics
Snowboarders at the 2010 Winter Olympics
Sportspeople from Nagano Prefecture
Asian Games medalists in snowboarding
Snowboarders at the 2003 Asian Winter Games
Snowboarders at the 2007 Asian Winter Games
Asian Games silver medalists for Japan
Medalists at the 2007 Asian Winter Games
21st-century Japanese women